George Jordaris Georgiou (born 19 August 1972 in St Pancras, London, England), is an English footballer who played as a forward. He played in the Football League for Fulham.

References

External links

1972 births
Living people
English footballers
People from St Pancras, London
Fulham F.C. players
Wembley F.C. players
Enfield F.C. players
Cheshunt F.C. players
Thurrock F.C. players
Dagenham & Redbridge F.C. players
Leyton F.C. players
English Football League players
Association football forwards